Anne Kjersti Kalvå (born 5 June 1992) is a Norwegian cross-country skier.

She competed at the 2012 Nordic Junior World Ski Championships, managing a 34th and 52nd place, also placing lowly at the 2014 Nordic U23 World Ski Championships, but ultimately recording a fifth and ninth place at the 2015 Nordic U23 World Ski Championships.

She made her World Cup debut in March 2013 in the sprint event in Drammen, ending 51st. She collected her first World Cup points with a 28th place in  January 2017 in Toblach, and broke the top 20 for the first time with a 19th place in the 30 km event in Holmenkollen in March 2017. In the 2017–18 Tour de Ski she managed an eight place in the Oberstdorf leg of the tour, and a 22nd place overall. Another eight place followed in December 2019, in the sprint event in Davos.

She represents the sports club Lundamo IL.

Cross-country skiing results
All results are sourced from the International Ski Federation (FIS).

World Championships
3 medals – (1 gold, 2 silver)

World Cup

Season standings

Individual podiums
 3 podiums – (2 , 1 )

Team podiums
 1 victory – (1 ) 
 3 podiums – (3 )

References

External links

1992 births
Living people
People from Melhus
Norwegian female cross-country skiers
Tour de Ski skiers
Sportspeople from Trøndelag
FIS Nordic World Ski Championships medalists in cross-country skiing